Bolko is a given name. Notable people with the name include:

Bolko I of Opole (1258–1313), Duke of Opole from 1282, Niemodlin and Strzelce Opolskie until his death
Bolko I the Strict (1252–1301), Duke of Lwówek, Jawor and of Świdnica-Ziębice
Bolko II of Opole (1300–1356), Duke of Opole from 1313
Bolko II of Ziębice (1300–1341), Duke of Jawor-Lwówek-Świdnica-Ziębice, of Świdnica-Ziębice, then of Ziębice
Bolko II the Small (c. 1312 – 1368), the last independent Duke of the Piast dynasty in Silesia
Bolko III of Ziębice (1348–1410), Duke of Münsterberg and ruler over Gleiwitz
Bolko III of Strzelce (1337–1382), Duke of Opole and Duke of Strzelce
Bolko IV of Opole (1363–1437), Duke of Strzelce and Niemodlin, then Duke of Opole
Bolko V the Hussite (1400–1460), Duke of Opole, then ruler over Głogówek and Prudnik, Duke of Strzelce and Niemodlin, ruler over Olesno
Bolko von Richthofen (1899–1983), German archaeologist and a distant relative of the family of Manfred von Richthofen, the "Red Baron"